This is an incomplete list of ghost towns in the state of Kansas.  Many of the sites listed here are on private property and may be dangerous or illegal to visit.  It is recommended that you inquire with local authorities or property owners for access to these places.

Classifications
There are many factors and reasons as to why a community becomes abandoned (or nearly abandoned).
Transportation – With the development of major highways and interstates, people were willing to travel farther for goods and services causing local businesses in smaller towns to lose customers and ultimately close.  The more businesses that close the more people are apt to want to move away to a bigger town.  Transportation has played a major role in settlement in Kansas.  As traffic from the Oregon and Santa Fe Trails increased, towns boomed along them.  When railroads were established towns developed along the tracks or even moved to where the tracks were.
Politics – In Kansas, the political atmosphere was highly divided.  Towns were either pro-slavery or abolitionist.  When Kansas became a free state in 1861, pro-slavery towns died out.  Survival of a town also depended on if it won the county seat.  Towns that were contenders for the county seat and lost typically saw most, if not all, of their town die out.
Industry/employment – Towns that catered to a specific industry like coal mining or military housing were boom towns that quickly died when their markets collapsed. Some towns were abandoned in the 1930s during the Dust Bowl period which mainly relied on Agriculture.
Schools – Schools can serve as a place of civic pride.  Towns that lose their local school to consolidation can no longer root for their home team.  When a school district is closed and students moved to another district, the remaining abandoned school just adds insult to injury.
National economic depressions - There have been several economic depressions and recessions that have wiped towns off the map.  As people lose their jobs or have to move because of another job, towns lose population.
Eminent domain / flood control – Since 1951, the U.S. Army Corps of Engineers have sought to control floods through the building of dams along rivers and the resulting outcome is a town having to be moved or abandoned and demolished.
Environmental degradation – remnants of lead and zinc mining can cause soil contamination that can render entire communities uninhabitable; e.g. Treece.

List
List of ghost towns in Kansas, which aren't incorporated cities or unincorporated communities:

Allen County
 Cofachique
 Octagon City

Anderson County
 Hyattville

Atchison County
 Mount Pleasant
 Pardee

Butler County
 Oil Hill
 Plum Grove
 Wingate

Chase County
 Elk
 Ellinor
 Homestead
 Hymer
 Thurman

Cherokee County
 Treece

Cheyenne County
 Calhoun
 Hourglass
 Jaqua
 Lawnridge
 Marney
 Orlando

Clark County
 Lexington

Clay County
 Broughton
 Browndale

Cloud County
 Macyville
 Sibley
 Yuma

Cowley County
 Floral
 Wilmot

Decatur County
 Bassetville
 Decatur
 Hawkeye
 Hooker
 Jackson
 Lund
 Sheffield
 Shibboleth
 Stephen
 Vallonia

Doniphan County
 Geary

Douglas County
 Belvoir
 Franklin
 Lapeer
 Louisiana
 Media
 Prairie City
 Twin Mound
 Weaver

Elk County
 Cave Springs
 Fiat
 Upola

Ellis County
 Chetolah
 Easdale
 Hog Back
 Martin
 Mendota
 Palatine
 Rome
 Smoky Hill City
 Stockrange
 Turkville

Ellsworth County
 Terra Cotta

Finney County
 Eminence
 Ravanna

Franklin County
 Minneola
 Norwood
 Silkville

Geary County
 Alida
 Pawnee

Gove County
 Alanthus
 Hackberry
 Jerome

Graham County
 Fargo
 Happy
 Houston
 Kebar
 Millbrook
 Olean
 Roscoe
 Togo
 Turnerville
 Whitfield
 Wild Horse

Greeley County
 Astor

Greenwood County
 Teterville
 Thrall
 Utopia

Harper County
 Albion

Harvey County
 Annelly

Haskell County
 Santa Fe

Jewell County
 Dentonia
 Wesley Center

Labette County
 Mortimer

Leavenworth County
 Delaware City

Lincoln County
 Bacon
 Bayne
 Cedron
 Herman
 Lone Walnut
 Milo
 Monroe
 Orbitello
 Orworth
 Paris
 Pinon
 Pleasant Valley
 Pottersburg
 Rosette
 Topsy
 Towerspring
 Union Valley
 Woodey
 Yorktown

Linn County
 Hail Ridge

Logan County
 McAllaster
 Sheridan

Marion County
 Elk
 Gnadenau
 Hampson
 Oursler
 Waldeck
 Watchorn

Marshall County
 Bigelow
 Irving

Mitchell County
 Blue Hill
 Buel
 Coursens Grove
 Elmira
 Saltville
 Victor
 Walnut Grove
 West Asher

Montgomery County
 Le Hunt

Morris County
 Comiskey

Norton County
 Bower
 Brett
 Cactus
 Devizes
 Fairhaven
 Hanback
 Hedgewood
 Rayville
 Rockwell
 Smithton
 Wakeman

Osborne County
 Banks
 Bristow
 Cheyenne
 Delhi
 Deliverance
 Dial
 Emley
 Forney
 Free Will
 Handy
 Pleasant Plain
 Potterville
 Roundmound
 Twin Creek
 Vincent
 Yoxall

Ottawa County
 Vine Creek

Phillips County
 Crow
 Dickeyville
 Goode
 Jimtown
 Luctor
 Matteson
 Myrtle
 Pleasant Green
 Powell
 Wagnerville
 West Cedar

Rawlins County
 Achilles
 Beardsley
 Beaverton
 Burntwood
 Celia
 Chardon
 Gladstone
 Greshamton
 Mirage
 Rawlins
 Rotate

Reno County
 Kent

Republic County
 Sherdahl
 White Rock

Rice County
 Crawford
 Galt

Rooks County
 Adamson
 Alcona
 Amboy
 Chandler
 Cresson
 Earnest
 Frankton
 Gould City
 Highhill
 Hoskins
 Igo
 Laton
 McHale
 Motor
 Nyra
 Portage
 Slate
 Sugarloaf
 Survey
 Rockport

Rush County
 Belfield
 Brookdale
 Fenton
 Flavius
 Hampton
 Hutton
 Lippard
 Olney
 Pioneer
 Ryan
 Saunders
 West Point

Russell County
 Bayne
 Blue Stem
 East Wolf
 Fay
 Forest Hill
 Greenvale
 Hawley
 Jack
 Kennebec
 Success
 Winterset
 Woodville

Seward County
 Arkalon

Shawnee County
 Richland

Sheridan County
 Adell
 Alcyone
 Chicago
 Lucerne
 Museum
 Mystic
 Phelps
 Sheridan
 Ute
 Violenta

Smith County
 Cora
 Anderson
 Clifford
 Corvallis
 Covington
 Crystal Plains
 Custer
 Germantown
 Hardilee
 Jacksonburg
 Judson
 Ohio
 Troublesome
 Twelve Mile
 Tyner
 Uhl

Stevens County
 Woodsdale

Sumner County
 Bushnell
 Cleardale
 Doster
 Ewell
 Metcalf
 Roland
 Sumner City

Thomas County
 Copeland
 Cumberland
 Kuka
 Otterbourne
 Quickville

Trego County
 Banner
 Bosna
 Cyrus
 Wilcox

Wabaunsee County
 Vera

Wichita County
 Farmer City

See also
 List of counties in Kansas
 List of townships in Kansas
 List of cities in Kansas
 List of unincorporated communities in Kansas
 List of census-designated places in Kansas
 Lists of places in Kansas
 Kansas locations by per capita income
 Kansas census statistical areas
 Kansas license plate county codes

References

External links
Kansas Dead Town List The Kansas Historical Society has a list of the Kansas "Dead Towns" online.  These lists are detailed in books available at the Society in Topeka.
Lost Kansas Communities Project from the Chapman Center For Rural Studies at Kansas State University

American Old West-related lists

Kansas geography-related lists
Kansas